The following is a list of supernatural beings in Chinese folklore and fiction originating from traditional folk culture and contemporary literature such as Pu Songling's Strange Stories from a Chinese Studio. This list contains only common supernatural beings who are inherently "evil" in nature, such as ghosts and demons, and beings who are lesser than deities. There are also ghosts with other characteristics. They are classified in some Chinese Buddhist texts.

Aoyin (傲因) 
The Aoyin. is an ancient humanoid monster with a long tongue, sharp claws, and wearing tattered clothes. It likes to eat human brains. It is recorded in "Shenyi Jing: Southwest Desolate Classic" (神异经·西南荒经).

Ba jiao gui (芭蕉鬼) 

Ba jiao gui is a female ghost that dwells in a banana tree and appears wailing under the tree at night, sometimes carrying a baby. In some folktales from Thailand, Malaysia and Singapore, greedy people ask for lottery numbers from the ghost in the hope of winning money. They tie a red string around the tree trunk, stick sharp needles into the tree, and tie the other end of the string to their beds. At night, the ghost appears and begs the person to set her free. In return, she will give them a set of winning numbers. If the person does not fulfil his/her promise to set the ghost free after winning, they will meet with a horrible death. This ghost is similar in some aspects to the Pontianak/Kuntilanak in Malay and Indonesian folklore.

Baigujing (白骨精）

Chimei（魑魅） 

Chi Mei, also known as Chi Mei, is a legendary monster that specializes in harming people in the mountains and forests. "Zuo Zhuan: Eighteen Years of Wengong": "There are four fierce tribes, Hundun, Qiongqi, Taotie, and Taotie, who are cast in the four tribes to control the charm of Chi." Lu Deming explained: "Charm, death is ready to be cut." "Historical Records, Five Emperors": "Shunbin was in the four gates, and he belonged to the four evil tribes. He moved to the four descendants to control the charm, so the four gates opened up. Say no to murderers. "Shuowen" reads as 'Yan', and it says: 'The old essence is also. Ying, or never.'" Yang Bojun's note: "Zi Mei, the monster in the fantasy of the ancients can harm people." Jin Luji's "Elegy Poems" "The second: "The longevity hall extends the charm of Chi, and there is nothing in the room." Zhang Binglin's poem "Shen Yuxi Seeing Killing in Prison": "Chili is ashamed and fighting for flames, and the article always breaks the soul." "Book of Jin Fanning Biography" ": "Wang He talked about the floating reputation at home and abroad, and the proud birth of the plastered beams. Painting the charm of the chime is a coincidence, and the fan is not inspected as a vulgar." Those who cast the four descendants in order to control the charm." Yan Shigu commented: "The ghost is also the god of the mountain. The charm is the essence of the old things." "Selected Works Zhang Heng <Tokyo Fu>": "The charm of the ghost, the madness of the tau." Xue Zong's note: "The charm, the god of mountains and lakes." Tang Lulun's "Song of the Two Knives": "The knife is like the knife and He Yeye, the charm must hide the monster and must be deterred." The arrogant face is arrogant and arrogant, as if seeing a ghost and a ghost in a mountain." Ming Xu Fuzuo's "To Shuo Ji: The Chou": "I secretly think that the court will be dark in the daytime, and the ghost will be openly excited." Lu Yin's "Or Human Sorrows": " They don't need a mirror, just look at their monstrous appearance." One of Song Su Shi's "To Changzhou Thank You": "Already separated, sent the wreckage to the monstrosity; dared to choose a place, and received the twilight scenery in Sangyu."

Daolaogui (刀劳鬼) 

The Daolaogui often haunts the deep mountains of the Linchuan area of Jiangxi Province. When the Daolaogui appears, it is often accompanied by strong winds and heavy rain. The sound of the ghost of knife labor is like a grown man roaring. People call this kind of roaring. "Ghost scream" or "Ghost Howl" is also called "Ghost Cry". The reason why it appears accompanied by strong wind and heavy rain may be because they want to hide their voice after the sound of strong wind and heavy rain. The Swordsman Ghost is a very scary ghost, its appearance is very scary, and the Swordsman Ghost will exhale a highly poisonous gas from its mouth, which will shoot at people like an arrow, where it is attacked by the poisonous gas. It will swell up quickly, and it will be poisoned to death in less than a day. The most terrifying thing is that if a person poisoned by a knife-torn ghost will become a knife-torn ghost if not treated by fire, this is a bit like a zombie. People who are bitten by zombies will become zombies without treatment.

The Daolaogui is divided into male ghosts and female ghosts. The whole body of the male ghost is dark green, and the toxicity is violent, while the whole body of the female ghost is purple and slightly less toxic. Although the swordsman ghosts are very scary, the area where they can move is very limited, and they only like to hide in the damp and cold places in the deep mountains. The movement speed of the swordsman is not very fast. If you encounter them, you just need to hold your breath and run away quickly. Even if it is accidentally poisoned, cutting off the swollen area within half a day can save your life. In general, the swordsman is still very scary and dangerous.

Di fu ling 

Di fu ling refers to ghosts who are bound to certain locations on Earth, such as their place of burial or a place they had a strong attachment to when they were alive.

Diao si gui 

Diao si gui are the ghosts of people who died from hanging due to various reasons (e.g. execution, suicide, accident). They are usually depicted with long red tongues sticking out of their mouths.

E gui 

E gui refers to ghosts that appear during the Ghost Festival. They are the spirits of people who committed sins out of greed when they were alive, and have been condemned to suffer in hunger after death. The e gui is usually depicted as having green or grey skin, a mouth too small for ingesting food, and sometimes with a potbelly. The ghost suffers from insatiable hunger and roams the streets and kitchens in search of offerings and decomposed food. These hungry ghosts consume anything, including excreted waste and rotten flesh. There are various types: some have fire-breathing abilities while others suffer from anorexia.

Gui po 

Gui po is a ghost that takes the form of a peaceful and friendly old woman. They may be the spirits of amahs who used to work as servants in rich families. They return to help their masters with housekeeping matters or take care of young children and babies. However, there are also evil gui pos with disgusting and violent appearances.

Hanba

Heibai Wuchang

Huapigui (画皮鬼) 
The Huapigui first appeared in the painted skin record of the famous novel "Strange Tales from a Chinese Studio" in the Qing Dynasty. It is a ferocious ghost who eats humans and wear their victim's skin. Its initial appearance is green due to its rotten form but it usually takes the form of a beautiful woman it killed. Huapigui means "Painted skin ghost".

Jikiyam 
Jian refers to the "ghost" of a ghost. A story in volume 5 of Pu Songling's Strange Stories from a Chinese Studio contained the following line: "A person becomes a ghost after death, a ghost becomes a jian after death."

Jiangshi 

The jiangshi is also known as the "Chinese vampire" even though it behaves more like a zombie rather than a vampire (in Western cultures). They are reanimated corpses that move by hopping around and they kill living beings to absorb their yang energy.

Niu tou ma mian

Nü gui 

Nü gui, is a vengeful female ghost with long hair in a white dress. In folklore, this ghost is the spirit of a woman who committed suicide while wearing a red dress. Usually, she experienced some form of injustice when she was alive, such as being wronged or sexually abused. She returns to take her revenge. A tabloid story tells of a funeral ceremony where family members of a murder victim dress her in red, in the hope that her spirit will return to take revenge on her murderer. In traditional folklore, the colour red symbolizes anger and vengeance. On the other hand, some ancient folktales tell of beautiful female ghosts who seduce men and suck their yang essence or sometimes kill them. This type of female ghost is likened to the Succubus. Paradoxically, the male counterpart of a nü gui, a nan gui, is rarely mentioned.

Pipagui (琵琶鬼) 
"Pipa ghost" is the Chinese transliteration of the Dai language "pibo", which is regarded as the most vicious kind of ghost in society. The Pipagui often gather in tropical where there the climate is humid, poisonous insects, snakes and ants were plenty, causing malaria to be widespread in the area. Historically, the gathering places of the Dai people were generally located in tropical rain forests, where the climate was humid, and the poisonous insects, snakes and ants were inundated, causing malaria to be widespread in the area, and medical conditions were limited at that time. The Dai villagers who believe in ghosts and gods think that this is the haunting of hungry ghosts – "Pipa ghost" comes from this.

"Pi" is a ghost, "Pa" is the name of a ghost, and "Pipa ghost" is a hungry ghost, which will be attached to people. This kind of ghost generally does not have a free body, and the free body is what we call a lonely ghost. "Pipa Ghosts" are generally provided by people, and the supporters cast spells to make "Pipa Ghosts" possessed by people who hate them. Once possessed by them, they will be seriously ill, be in a trance, or die in severe cases. To eliminate this symptom, you need to take tobacco, alcohol, tea, and meat, and sincerely admit your mistake to the caster. These people who can put "Pipa Ghosts" in the village are always frightened. Some young and bold villagers who are jealous of evil have heard that people who are possessed by "Pipa Ghosts" are generally weak in constitution. of. So after the village reached an agreement, these people were driven out of the village and their houses were burnt down, and those who were driven out gradually gathered to form new villages, which people called "ghost villages".

Qianliyan 

Qianliyan is a Chinese sea and door god. He usually appears with Shunfeng'er as a guardian of the temples of the sea goddess Mazu.

Shui gui 

Shui gui are the spirits of people who drowned. They lurk in the place where they died, drag unsuspecting victims underwater, and drown them to take possession of their bodies. This process is known as ti shen, in which the spirit returns to life in the victim's body while the victim's spirit takes the shui guis place and constantly seeks to take control of another living person's body.

 Shunfeng'er Shunfeng'er''' is a Chinese sea and door god. He usually appears with Qianliyan as a guardian of the temples of the sea goddess Mazu.

 Wutou gui Wutou gui are headless ghosts who roam about aimlessly. They are the spirits of people who were killed by decapitation due to various causes (e.g. execution, accident). In some tales, the wutou gui approaches people at night and asks them where his/her head is. The wutou gui is sometimes depicted as carrying his/her head on the side.

 You hun ye gui You hun ye gui refer to the wandering spirits of the dead. They roam the world of the living in the Seventh Lunar Month (typically August in the Gregorian calendar) during the Ghost Festival. These spirits include vengeful ghosts seeking revenge on those who offended them before, hungry ghosts (see the E gui section above), and playful spirits who might cause trouble during that period.

Some of these spirits have no living relatives or resting place, while others might lose their way and cannot return to the Underworld in time, so they continue to roam the world of the living after the Seventh Lunar Month. In Taiwan, there are shrines and temples set up for the worship of "You Ying Gong", a name which collectively refers to such "lost" spirits, in the hope that these spirits would not cause harm to the living. There are classified by some scholars from various universities in Taiwan. Some of these spirits may become deities known as "Wang Ye".

The Chinese idiom gu hun ye gui, which describes such spirits, is also used to refer to homeless people or those who wander around aimlessly.

 Yuan gui Yuan gui are the spirits of persons who died wrongful deaths. Beliefs in such ghosts had surfaced in China from as early as the Zhou dynasty and were recorded in the historical text Zuo Zhuan. These ghosts can neither rest in peace nor be reincarnated. They roam the world of the living as depressed and restless spirits who constantly seek to have their grievances redressed. In some tales, these ghosts approach living people and attempt to communicate with them in order to lead them to clues or pieces of evidence that point out that they died wrongful deaths. The living people then try to help them clear their names or otherwise ensure that justice is served.

 Ying ling Ying ling refer to the spirits of dead fetuses. The idea of such spirits are purported to have originated in Japan. Memorial services are held for them in Taiwan. A writer identified as "Zuigongzi" (lit. "drunk gentleman") wrote an article on thinkerstar.com in 2004 to claim that the stories of ying ling were fabricated.

 Zhi ren Zhi ren are dolls made from paper that are burnt as offerings to the dead to become the deceased's servants. These dolls usually come in pairs – one male and one female – and are sometimes called jin tong yu nü. These dolls are not exactly spirits by themselves, but they can do the bidding of their deceased masters.

 Zhong yin shen Zhong yin shen'' refers to a spirit in a transition state between their death and when they are reincarnated, as described in Mahayana Buddhism. This period of time is usually 49 days.

Others

A 
 Ao (媪)

B 
 Baiye (白鵺)
 Bijianshou (比肩兽)
 Bifang (毕方)
 Bingfeng (并封)
 Bi'an (狴犴)
 Bixie (辟邪)
 Babo'erben (灞波儿奔)
 Bingcan (冰蚕)
 Bingmo (病魔)
 Benbo'erba (奔波儿灞)
 Bo (駮)
 Baiyanmojun (百眼魔君)
 Bishuijinjingshou (避水金晶兽)
 Baoyu (薄鱼)
 Baiyuan (白猿)
 Bailong (白龙)
 Bailu (白鹿)
 Benfu (奔浮)
 Baijueyao (败屩妖)
 Banyiguipo (斑衣鳜婆)
 Boyi (猼訑)

C 
 Chiyou (蚩尤)
 Chenshimingji (沉石明鸡)
 Chaofeng (嘲风)
 Citie (呲铁)
 Chiru (赤鱬)
 Chongwei (虫为)
 Chilong (赤龙)
 Chenghuang (乘黄)
 Chihu (赤虎)
 Chishejing (赤蛇精)
 Chousheng (仇生)
 Chishengui (赤身鬼)
 Chaigui (虿鬼)
 Changui (产鬼)
 Chunshisanniang (春十三娘)
 Chikaomahou (赤尻马猴)
 Ciluo (茈蠃)
 Changgui (伥鬼)

D 
 Dongmingcao (洞冥草)
 Dongxi (东曦)
 Doinb (动态)
 Dafeng (大风)
 Dapeng (大鹏)
 Dangui (丹龟)
 Dansheng (担生)
 Delang (地狼)
 Danxia (丹虾)
 Danque (丹雀)
 Dufujin (妒妇津)
 Donghaikuiniu (东海夔牛)
 Daoli (盗骊)
 Dijiang (帝江)
 Dihong (帝鸿)
 Daoshou (倒寿)
 Dushelong (毒蛇龙)
 Duzugui (独足鬼)
 Dujiaomowang (独角魔王)
 Duoji (多即)
 Damangjing (大蟒精)
 Dapengmowang (大鹏魔王)
 Dangkang (当康)
 Danyu (丹鱼)
 Dujiaoyang (独角羊)
 Dujiaosidawang (独角兕大王)
 Duyao (蠹妖)
 Dujiaogui (独脚鬼) or Shanxiao(山魈)

E 
 Ershu (耳鼠)
 Erzhongren (耳中人)
 Eshou (讹兽)

F 
 Fuyao (蝠妖)
 Feifei (腓腓)
 Fengxi (封豨)
 Fengli(风狸)
 Fengguanniangzi (凤管娘子)
 Fuziguai (蝮子怪)
 Fuxi (凫徯)
 Fuzhu (夫诸)
 Fuyuanjun (福缘君)
 Fenyang (羵羊)
 Fei (蜚)
 Fuchong (蝮虫)
 Feishu (飞鼠)
 Feitouman (飞头蛮)
 Feidanniao (飞诞鸟)
 Feiyi (肥遗)
 Fengwulao (峰五老)
 Fenghuang (凤凰)
 Fengyao (蜂妖)
 Feilian (飞廉)
 Fuyunsou (拂云叟)
 Feiniao (吠鸟)

G 
 Gongzhouchengsanguai (巩州城三怪)
 Gu (鼓)
 Goutouman (狗头鳗)
 Guohou (国后)
 Guhuoniao (姑获鸟)
 Guozhang (国丈)
 Goushe (钩蛇)
 Guixu (归墟)
 Guzhigong (孤直公)
 Guanxiongren (贯匈人)
 Guailong (乖龙)
 Gubailao (古柏老)
 Guiche (鬼车)
 Guili (鬼吏)
 Gudiao (蛊雕)

H 
 Heihai’ertaizi (黑孩儿太子)
 Huowu (火乌)
 Huan (讙)
 Heifengguai (黑风怪)
 Huangzhangmowang (慌张魔王)
 Heilong (黑龙)
 Henggongyu (横公鱼)
 Huapo (花魄)
 Hongni (虹霓)
 Huoxing (火星)
 Huangpaoguai (黄袍怪)
 Heyu (合逾)
 Huanglong (黄龙)
 Huangfengguai (黄风怪)
 Huashe (化蛇)
 Huan (患)
 Huying (虎鹰)
 Huweimowang (虎威魔王)
 Hongliuwa (红榴娃)
 Huangyalaoxiang (黄牙老象)
 Huagai (华盖)
 Honglindamang (红鳞大蟒)
 Hongnv (虹女)
 Hairuo (海若)
 Haozhi (豪彘)
 Huiyao (虺妖)
 Hunshimowang (混世魔王)
 Hundun (浑沌)
 Huangshijing (黄狮精)
 Honghai’er (红孩儿)
 Huangmeidawang (黄眉大王)
 Haizhizhu (海蜘蛛)
 Huayao (花妖))
 Huoshu (火鼠)
 Humeiniang (胡媚娘)
 Heluoyu (何罗鱼)
 Heiyujing (黑鱼精)
 Haoyu (豪鱼)
 Haoqimowang (耗气魔王)
 Hushen (虎神)
 Huangfengdawang (黄风大王)
 Huangfugui (黄父鬼)
 Hanli (含利)
 Hou (犼)
 Huodou (祸斗)
 Huangui (患鬼)
 Hu’aqi (狐阿七)
 Hulidaxian (虎力大仙)

J 
 Junren (菌人)
 Jinjiao (金角)
 Jinhuamao (金华猫)
 Jiuweihu (九尾狐)
 Jiutouzhijijing (九头雉鸡精)
 Jiu’erquan (九耳犬)
 Jiaochong (骄虫)
 Jiuweigui (九尾龟)
 Jiaoren (鲛人)
 Jiuselu (九色鹿)
 Jimeng (计蒙)
 Jiaoduan (角端)
 Jiangtun (江豚)
 Jinjieshibagong (劲节十八公)
 Jiutoufuma (九头驸马)
 Jiulingyuansheng (九灵元圣)
 Jidiao (吉吊)
 Jiliang (吉量)
 Jufu (举父)
 Jietuodawang (解脱大王)
 Jiuying (九婴)
 Jimeng (计蒙)
 Jiaogui (角圭)
 Jiao (狡)
 Jiaojing (鲛精)
 Jiulingyuanshengliusun (九灵元圣六孙)
 Jiaomowang (蛟魔王)
 Jianglaizhixu (姜赖之墟)
 Jiao (蛟)
 Jiaolong (角龙) (the monster)
 Jiaohu (角虎)
 Jiegou (絜钩)
 Jiuweishe (九尾蛇)
 Jueyuan (攫猿)
 Jianke (谏珂)
 Jingren (靖人)
 Juru (狙如)
 Jiuchong (酒虫)

K 
 Kun (鲲)
 Kaimingshou (开明兽)
 Kui (夔)
 Kuilong (夔龙)

L 
 Lingmingshihou (灵明石猴)
 Lushu (鹿蜀)
 Long (龙)
 Laojian (老蹇)
 Longchu (龙刍)
 Liukunmowang (六鲲魔王)
 Longbo (龙伯)
 Lvtoulang (驴头狼)
 Lingyu (陵鱼)
 Liu’ermowang (六耳魔王)
 Longzhi (蠪姪)
 Luotoumin (落头民)
 Luoshaniao (罗刹鸟)
 Liuzushou (六足兽)
 Luozu (罗祖)
 Lvlang (绿郎)
 Lingguilao (灵龟老)
 Lili (狸力)
 Lingkongzi (凌空子)
 Linggui (灵龟)
 Linggandawang (灵感大王)
 Lingque (灵鹊)
 Lingshuangshiping (灵爽式凭)
 Liu’ermihou (六耳猕猴)
 Lvshu (驴鼠)
 Liuyudawang (六欲大王)
 Lvma (驴马)
 Luoluo (罗罗)
 Lintaojuren (临洮巨人)
 Liushen (柳神)
 Lulidaxian (鹿力大仙)
 Luoyu (蠃鱼)
 Luan (鸾)
 Luanxiaofuren (鸾萧夫人)

M 
 Meishanqiguai (梅山七怪)
 Mogui (魔鬼)
 Mishimowang (迷识魔王)
 Mabanshe (马绊蛇)
 Mafu (马腹)
 Manman (蛮蛮)
 Maolong (毛龙)
 Miyao (麋妖)
 Minniao (民鸟)
 Maren (马人)
 Manjintai (蔓金苔)
 Mihouwang (猕猴王)
 Meiweijun (美蔚君)
 Muwangbajun (穆王八骏)
 Mamian (马面)
 Miwang (蜜王)
 Mukeniao (木客鸟)
 Mo (貘)
 Miaogui (庙鬼)
 Mingshe (鸣蛇)
 Menglangmowang (孟浪魔王)
 Mohai (貘㺔)
 Maorongpo (猫容婆)
 Maogui (猫鬼)

N 
 Nanhaijiaoren (南海鲛人)
 Nanhaihudie (南海蝴蝶)
 Niumowang (牛魔王)
 Niexiaoqian (聂小倩)
 Nvegui (疟鬼)
 Nigui (泥鬼)
 Niuyu (牛鱼)
 Nanshandawang (南山大王)
 Niutou (牛头)
 Nvyecha (女夜叉)
 Niunengyan (牛能言)

P 
 Pixiu (貔貅)
 Pufu (朴父)
 Panguan (判官)
 Pianpian (翩翩)
 Pojingshou (破镜兽)
 Pipajing (琵琶精)
 Peng (鹏)
 Paoxiao (咆鸮)
 Penghou (彭侯)
 Pengshe (朋蛇)
 Pihandawang 辟寒大王
 Pishudawang 辟暑大王
 Pichendawang 辟尘大王

Q 
 Quehuoque (却火雀)
 Qiuyu (犰狳) (the monster)
 Qiongqi (穷奇)
 Qingshidaoren (青狮道人)
 Qingyujing (鲭鱼精)
 Qingwashen (青蛙神)
 Qing’e (青娥)
 Qingshiwang (青狮王)
 Qilin (麒麟)
 Quechenxi (却尘犀)
 Qiuniu (囚牛)
 Qiqingdawang (七情大王)
 Qingwen (青鴍)
 Qingniu (青牛)
 Qiangliang (强良)
 Qiongshu (邛疏)
 Quzhousanguai (衢州三怪)
 Qinzhimaoren (秦之毛人)
 Qingchunshijiedawangxiaoyuewang (青春世界大王小月王)
 Qingfeng (青凤)
 Qidaosheng (七大圣)
 Qiantangjun (銭塘君)
 Qingji (庆忌)
 Quexiandawang (缺陷大王)
 Qiyu (契俞)
 Quru (瞿如)
 Qinglong (青龙)
 Qionggui (穷鬼)
 Qionglang (玱琅)
 Qinyuan (钦原)
 Qizhong (跂踵)

R 
 Ruyizhenxian (如意真仙)
 Riji (日及)
 Ruishi (瑞狮)
 Renmianxiao (人面鸮)
 Renhu (人虎)
 Ruhe (如何)
 Renshe (人蛇)
 Ranyiyu (冉遗鱼)

S 
 Sanzuwu (三足乌)
 Shijiniangniang (石矶娘娘)
 Sanshi (三尸)
 Shejing (蛇精)
 Sanjiaoshou (三角兽)
 Suanni (狻猊)
 Shuairan (率然)
 Sanzugui (三足龟)
 Shen (蜃)
 Sandaxian (三大仙)
 Shangfu (尚付)
 Songhu (耸弧)
 Shangyang (商羊)
 Shanjiao (山椒)
 Sixiong (四凶)
 Shexian (蛇衔)
 Shengsheng (狌狌)
 Shihoumowang (狮吼魔王)
 Sanshidawang (三尸大王)
 Shuihu (水虎)
 Sibuxiang (四不像)
 Shimaoguai (狮毛怪)
 Shuiluogui (水落鬼)
 Suanyu (酸与)
 Shangao (山膏)
 Shituowang (狮驼王)
 Shanheshang (山和尚)
 Sanzubie (三足鳖)
 Sidashenhou (四大神猴)
 Shanqingjun (善庆君)
 Sangku (丧哭)
 Shanzhizhu (山蜘蛛)
 Shituolingsanmowang (狮驼岭三魔王)
 Saitaisui (赛太歳)
 Shuangjing (双睛)
 Suoming (索冥)
 Shile (世乐)
 Shuoyinmowang (铄阴魔王)
 Shanshao (山臊)
 Sunwukong (孙悟空)
 Sunxiaosheng (孙小圣)
 Shawujing (沙悟净)
 Shuhu (孰胡)
 Shelujing (麝鹿精)

T 
 Taotie (饕餮)
 Taowu (梼杌)
 Tianzhi (天织)
 Tieshangongzhu (铁扇公主)
 Tongbiyuanhou (通臂猿猴)
 Tunkou (呑口)
 Tulou (土蝼)
 Tiebeiqiuwang (铁背虬王)
 Tenghua (藤花)
 Taige (鲐鮯)
 Tuofei (橐蜚)
 Tianhu (天狐)
 Tiaoshen (跳神)
 Techushi (特处士)
 Tianlu (天鹿)
 Tianyucao (天雨草)
 Tongren (瞳人)
 Taisui (太岁)

W 
 Wuzhiqi (无支祁)
 Wangxiang (罔象)
 Wangyuyu (王馀鱼)
 Wangmushizhe (王母使者)
 Wutongshen (五通神)
 Waguai (蛙怪)
 Wenmingdawang (文明大王)
 Wanshenglongwang (万圣龙王)
 Wenwen (文文)
 Wujing (鼯精)
 Weiyi (委蛇)
 Wuzushou (五足兽)
 Woquan (偓佺)
 Wenyaoyu (文鳐鱼)
 Wangtianhou (望天吼)
 Woquan (偓佺)
 Wushang (无伤)
 Wangliang (魍魉)
 Wuwenhua (邬文化)

X 
 Xianzhuzhilong (衔烛之龙)
 Xuhao (虚耗)
 Xiwangmu (西王母)
 Xiezijing (蝎子精)
 Xiebao (谢豹)
 Xiexiaoyao (蝎小妖)
 Xishu (奚鼠)
 Xiezhi (獬豸)
 Xuanfeng (玄蜂)
 Xuanwu (玄武)
 Xixi (鰼鰼)
 Xianli (仙狸)
 Xiaoniao (枭鸟)
 Xiangliu (相柳)
 Xiquan (犀犬)
 Xiaoyangmowang (消阳魔王)
 Xixuejuren (吸血巨人)
 Xingyunmowang (兴云魔王)
 Xiaofu (啸父)
 Xiushe (修蛇)
 Xuanyu (玄鱼)
 Xuangui (旋龟)
 Xingtian (刑天)
 Xinang (溪嚢)
 Xiyou (希有)
 Xiaofengmowang (啸风魔王)
 Xuansu (玄俗)
 Xinang (傒囊)
 Xurongwang (獝狨王)

Y 
 Yazi (睚眦)
 Yaojiao (鳐鲛)
 Yinjiao (银角)
 Yigui (缢鬼)
 Yinglong (应龙)
 Yanju (炎驹)
 Yijiaoshou (一角兽)
 Yimuwuxiansheng (一目五先生)
 Yalongdaxian (压龙大仙)
 Yuantuo (鼋鼍)
 Yayu (猰貐)
 Yupei (育沛)
 Yi (鹢)
 Yuanfeiji (远飞鸡)
 Yingshengchong (应声虫)
 Yigui (役鬼)
 Yumiangongzhu (玉面公主)
 Yumianniangniang (玉面娘娘)
 Yingmu (影木)
 Yinggou (嬴勾) and Yinggou (赢勾)
 Youanniao (幽安鸟)
 Yunyang (云阳)
 Yaomoguiguai (妖魔鬼怪)
 Yutao (玉桃)
 Yeniao (冶鸟)
 Yatun (牙豚)
 Yutou (鱼头)
 Yegouzi (野狗子)
 Yecha (夜叉)
 Yonghe (雍和)
 Yinguai (阴怪) and Yangguai (阳怪)
 Yuji (玉鸡)
 Yong (颙)
 Yaogui (咬鬼)
 Youlaiyouqu (有来有去)
 Yunzhongzi (云中子)
 Yuyiren (羽衣人)
 Yuanyao (蚖妖)
 Yunchengwanlipeng (云程万里鹏)
 Yufu (鱼妇)
 Yingzhao (英招)
 Yuanxian (元仙)
 Yaoshou (药兽)
 Yanwei (延维)
 Yaueshen (岳神)
 Yinchen Mowang (阴沉魔王)
 Yiniao (翳鸟)
 Yigui (疫鬼)
 Yu (蜮)
 Yanglidaxian (羊力大仙)
 Yutujing (玉兔精)
 Yinglong (应龙)
 Yeming (噎鸣)
 Yujiang (禺疆)

Z 
 Zaochi (凿齿)
 Zhutunshe (猪豚蛇)
 Zhubajie (猪八戒)
 Zhujian (诸犍)
 Zhupolong (猪婆龙)
 Zhunou (朱獳)
 Zhizhujing (蜘蛛精)
 Zaohuaxiao'er (造化小儿)
 Zaoju (藻居)
 Zhongguobashenshou (中国八神兽)
 Zhuyijie (猪一戒)
 Zhaohaijing (照海镜)
 Zheng (狰)
 Zhuyan (朱厌)
 Zhuyin (烛阴)
 Zhuyu (祝余)
 Zhen (鸩)
 Zhujiweng (祝鸡翁)
 Zhaiyao (宅妖)
 Zhuque (朱雀)
 Zhuoquan (䶂犬)
 Zhanyanjiejiebulaopopo (长颜姐姐不老婆婆)
 Zhangyou(长右)
 Zhongmingniao(重明鸟)
 Zhuniao (鴸鸟)
 Zhujiweng (祝鸡翁)
 Zouyu (驺虞)

See also 

 Chinese mythology
 Chinese folklore
 Hungry ghosts in Chinese religion
 Radical 194

References 

 

Buddhist folklore
Chinese folklore
Chinese ghosts
Characters in Chinese mythology
Cultural lists